The Sevastopol City Council (Crimean Tatar: Aqyar şeer şurası) is the unicameral legislature of the Ukrainian city of Sevastopol. The Council is composed by 76 members.

Background

On the basis of the Law of Ukraine "On the representative of the President of Ukraine", the Decree of the President of Ukraine on April 14, 1992 "On the situation of the local public administration" and the disposal of the President of Ukraine in Sevastopol number 9 from April 24, 1992 the Sevastopol city state administration was created, which superseded the Executive Committee of the Sevastopol City Council. In June 1994, the first direct election of the chairman of the City Council was held in Sevastopol.

On August 2, 1995 pursuant to paragraph 1 of the Decree of the President of Ukraine № 640/95 of July 24, 1995 "On regional, Kyiv and Sevastopol city and of districts in the cities of Kyiv and Sevastopol state administrations" formed the Sevastopol City State Administration. In September 1998, by the decision of the Constitutional Court of Ukraine, Sevastopol was denied a direct vote to elect the chairman of the Council due to the lack of a law on the status of Sevastopol. For this reason, the chairman of the City Council was subsequently elected by the deputies of the City Council.

Following the 2014 Russian annexation of Crimea, the City Council was unilaterally proclaimed to have been disbanded by the Russian occupying authorities and replaced by a Legislative Assembly of Sevastopol, although the Council still operates de jure as the city's parliament in Ukraine.

Composition
The most recent composition of the council was as follows:

Notes

References

External links
 

Government of Sevastopol
Politics of Sevastopol
Annexation of Crimea by the Russian Federation
City councils